Birds of the Master is volume five in the French comic book (or bande dessinée) science fiction series Valérian and Laureline created by writer Pierre Christin and artist Jean-Claude Mézières.

Synopsis

Valérian and Laureline's astroship has crashed in the middle of a graveyard of spaceships on an unknown asteroid. Swept over a waterfall, they are rescued by a motley group of various aliens gathering seaweed. Suddenly, overhead, a flock of birds gathers over the ship. The crew fly into a panic upon sight of these "Birds-Of-Madness" and Valérian and Laureline are ordered to work with the others in gathering the seaweed. One of the crew is a human but he refuses to talk to Valérian. The hold fully loaded, the boat begins the journey back to its port. On the way, they get into a conversation with a young alien called Sül who tells them that all the others are mad – they think only of gathering as much food as possible for their Master. Arriving at the village, they join a flotilla of boats that travels across the viscous marshes and along a series of fjords until they reach a cove – from here they must continue on foot. Laden with the produce, they reach the Village of the Fruits where they join a caravan carrying exotic fruits. When Valérian asks Sül who the Master is, Sül laughs – nobody has ever seen him but he calls all those he wants into his service. Some are brought here, others are born here. Many have been here so long they have no memory of their past lives.

The caravan continues across a vast distance, joined by more and more caravans all bringing their produce to the Master and watched by the birds-of-madness, until they reach his city at the head of an immense valley. The bottom of the valley, the domain of the Master, lies shrouded in mist. They are brought to the great kitchens where they are put to work preparing klaar to feed the master. When the klaar is ready, they are brought to a huge, beautifully decorated basin. The klaar is poured into the basin where it will flow to the Master. The others will be allowed to dine on the leftovers. Suddenly, a man, starving, detaches himself from the crowd and tries to take some of the klaar for himself. The birds-of-madness attack biting him. Sül tries to intervene but is bitten himself. The man now thinks he is a bird while Sül's hatred for the Master now manifests itself as fully fledged rage. Having sated themselves on the remnants of the klaar, the rest of the crowd turn on Sül and the man and, despite Valérian and Laureline's attempts to stop them, carry the two of them away. Valérian and Laureline follow but are too late and Sül and the man are thrown into a pit where all those driven insane by the birds are cast. Valérian tries to talk to the crowd, to make them see what they are doing is wrong but to no avail – the crowd hurl stones at them and Laureline is knocked unconscious. Valérian drags her away to safety.

That night, Valérian and Laureline return to the pit once the crowds have moved on. They rescue Sül and the rest of the madmen. As they try to make their escape on a chariot, the alarm is raised and they are pursued. They follow the Pathway of the Klaar towards the Master's lair. Eventually they pass into the forbidden lands and their pursuers give up the chase. Continuing to follow the Pathway of the Klaar, they are attacked by the birds-of-madness. Valérian and Laureline take shelter in a cave while the others form a shield around the entrance. This is not enough and Valérian and Laureline are bitten also. The attack passes and they find that they are almost at the bottom of the valley. A strange glow emanates from the mists.

Reaching the source of the glow, they find the Master – a large amorphous grey blob. Laureline hits upon a plan – if they destroy the Pathways of Klaar, the Master will starve. Valérian begins firing but suddenly he breaks down on the ground – his mind has been attacked by the Master, presenting him with terrible images of war and destruction. Laureline takes up the gun but is also struck down, terrified by images of her body being torn to pieces by machinery. Similarly, Sül and the rest of the madmen are taken down one by one by the Master's superior mental powers. Laureline realises that problem is that they attacked one at a time. Gathering the others together, they hold hands and use their combined strength to overcome the Master's influence. Suddenly, the Master rips himself free and flees into the sky followed by the birds-of-madness and the mist.

Realising they are free, the others consider settling in the Master's domain and living off the klaar. Valérian points out to them that it is not right to replace one dictator with another and they agree to return to the villages to free the others.

Later, a large group of people work to free Valérian's astroship from the marsh in the graveyard of spaceships. The astroship blasts off with just one passenger, Sül, the rest having decided to stay on the asteroid. They wonder where the Master has gone to, blissfully unaware that he has attached himself to hull of their ship...

Main characters
 Valérian, a spatio-temporal agent from Galaxity, future capital of Earth, in the 28th century
 Laureline, originally from France in the 11th century, now a spatio-temporal agent of Galaxity in the 28th century
 Sül, a young person from the planet Manadil in the Constellation of Cygnus
 The various unfortunates who have been driven insane by the Birds-Of-Madness:
 Two old people who constantly debate philosophy with each other
 Two rather grand ladies who believe they are on an interstellar cruise and want to complain to the captain about their poor treatment
 An old person who thinks he is a bird
 An old person who believes in taking things easy and not wearing out one's body
 A prospector from Aldebaran

Setting
The story is set on an unnamed asteroid wandering through space. The mysterious Master has set up home here at the bottom of an immense valley dotted with volcanoes and shrouded in a thick fog. He is fed by a series of wooden channels, called the Pathways of Klaar, along which his food, known as klaar, is poured. Wind turbines provide the power to drive the klarr along the channels to the Master. The klarr is prepared in a great city, hewn out of the rock, at the head of the valley, decorated all over with carved sculptures made in honour of the Master, that acts as a great kitchen. Nearby lies a great pit into which those driven insane by the Birds-Of-Madness are thrown to end their days. Outside the valley lie many villages engaged in agriculture or fishing where the ingredients that make up the klaar are cultivated, reared or hunted. The Master adds to his army of servants by luring passing spacecraft and brings them to ground in a marshy area, near a huge set of falls, that forms a vast graveyard of spaceships.

Valérian and Laureline
1973 graphic novels